Phantasiomyia is a genus of bristle flies in the family Tachinidae. There are at least two described species in Phantasiomyia.

Species
These two species belong to the genus Phantasiomyia:
 Phantasiomyia atripes (Coquillett, 1897)
 Phantasiomyia gracilis Townsend, 1915

References

Further reading

External links

 
 

Tachininae